The Deane House is a historic house at 1701 Arch Street in Little Rock, Arkansas.  It is a -story wood-frame structure, basically rectangular in plan, with gables and projecting sections typical of the Queen Anne style.  A single-story turret with conical roof stands at one corner, with a porch wrapping around it.  The porch is supported by heavy Colonial Revival Tuscan columns, and has a turned balustrade.  The house was probably built about 1888, and is one of the earliest documented examples of this transitional Queen Anne-Colonial Revival style in the city.  It was built for Gardiner Andrus Armstrong Deane, a Confederate veteran of the American Civil War, and a leading figure in the development of railroads in the state.

The house was listed on the National Register of Historic Places in 1975.

See also
National Register of Historic Places listings in Little Rock, Arkansas

References

Houses on the National Register of Historic Places in Arkansas
Queen Anne architecture in Arkansas
Neoclassical architecture in Arkansas
Houses completed in 1888
Houses in Little Rock, Arkansas
National Register of Historic Places in Little Rock, Arkansas
Historic district contributing properties in Arkansas